Rina (stylised in all caps) is the debut extended play by Japanese-British singer-songwriter Rina Sawayama. Also described as a mini album, Rina was independently released on 27 October 2017. Sawayama funded the album herself, working for "2-3 jobs at a time for years" to save enough to release the EP. Sawayama promoted the album through the Ordinary Superstar Tour in 2018.

Critical reception 

Rachel Aroesti of The Guardian called the EP "nostalgic" and capable of "shepard[ing] pop into the future." She praised "Alterlife" as a highlight and called it a "double-speed power ballad, replete with twinkling synths and an industrial guitar riff" and compared it to Grimes' 2015 album Art Angels. She also compared "Ordinary Superstar" to Britney Spears and Hannah Montana, with the former exerting heavy influence over the EP as a whole. Saam Idelji-Tehrani of The Line of Best Fit also praised Rina, saying "Although Sawayama's mini-album is one laced with nostalgia, she intelligently uses 90s pop and R&B as a canvas to paint 21st Century missives on internet addiction, alter-ego dependence and the gratification found through web-based validation." Idelji-Tehrani compared "Take Me As I Am" to "NSYNC-inspired power pop" and "Cyber Stockholm Syndrome" to Butterfly-era Mariah Carey.

In their list of the Top 20 Best Pop and R&B albums of 2017, Pitchfork ranked the album at number 19 praised Sawayama for her wide array of influences including experimental J-pop, Neptunes, Britney Spears, and synthwave, saying she has "a knack for them all". Dazed also ranked Rina as the 10th best album of 2017.

Track listing 
All songs written by Rina Sawayama and Clarence Clarity, except where noted. All production done by Clarence Clarity except where noted.

Charts

References

2017 debut EPs
Rina Sawayama albums
Albums produced by Clarence Clarity
Avant-pop albums
Self-released EPs